"Anthem of May Day" is a Bulgarian anthem used on May Day, written and composed by Methodius Grigorov.

History 
The song was based on a poem written by Georgi Kirkov. The poem was first printed in the Red People's Calendar in 1898. Initially, it was sung at workshops. The composer Georgi Goranov composes the music for the poem. The song is performed for the first time as known by generations of Bulgarians on May 24, 1903, in Kyustendil. She is singing the male choir of the Classical Consciousness Society, conducts the composer himself. Gradually the song becomes the Bulgarian anthem for 1 May.

Bulgarian lyrics

References

External links
May Day Lyrics
Anthem Of May Day (Vocal)

European anthems
Bulgarian songs
National symbols of Bulgaria